Sir Ambrose Dundas Flux Dundas  (14 April 1899 – 29 April 1973) was a British civil servant and colonial administrator in British India in what later became Pakistan. He was also Lieutenant Governor of the Isle of Man from 1952 to 1959.

Career
Flux Dundas was born in 1899, the son of Reverend Alfred William Flux Dundas. He was educated at the Harrow School, the Royal Military Academy, Woolwich, and Christ Church, Oxford.

He joined the Indian Civil Service in 1922 at the age of 23, and remained in the ICS until 1947, when the independence of Pakistan took place. He served as the last British governor of Khyber-Pakhtunkhwa (then called the North-West Frontier Province) of Pakistan from 1948 to 1949.

From 1952 to 1959 he was Lieutenant Governor of the Isle of Man. Prior to his appointment as Lieutenant Governor, Flux Dundas had been general manager of the Bracknell Development Corporation, an eight-member committee administering the construction and development of Bracknell New Town. He returned to the BDC in 1959, serving as its chairman until 1967.

He married Mary Forest Bracewell in 1931. They had one daughter, Anstice Ann Flux Dundas, born 12 December 1933 in Peshawar.

Flux Dundas died on 29 April 1973 at "Roxwell", his house in Binfield, Berkshire.


Honours
Flux Dundas was made a Companion of the Order of the Star of India (CSI) in 1946, and was knighted KCIE (Knight Commander of the Order of the Indian Empire) in 1948.

References

External links
Pathe film of Isle of Man's 19th governor being sworn in (BBC News)

1899 births
1973 deaths
British expatriates in Pakistan
Lieutenant Governors of the Isle of Man
Governors of Khyber Pakhtunkhwa
Chief Commissioners of Baluchistan
Knights Commander of the Order of the Indian Empire
Companions of the Order of the Star of India
People educated at Harrow School
Graduates of the Royal Military Academy, Woolwich
Alumni of Christ Church, Oxford
British civil servants
Indian Civil Service (British India) officers